Pseudomonas putida is a Gram-negative, rod-shaped, saprotrophic soil bacterium.

Based on 16S rRNA analysis, P. putida was taxonomically confirmed to be a Pseudomonas species (sensu stricto) and placed, along with several other species, in the P. putida group, to which it lends its name. However, phylogenomic analysis of complete genomes from the entire Pseudomonas genus clearly showed that the genomes that were named as P. putida did not form a monophyletic clade, but were dispersed and formed a wider evolutionary group (the putida group) that included other species as well, such as P. alkylphenolia, P. alloputida, P. monteilii, P. cremoricolorata, P. fulva, P. parafulva, P. entomophila, P. mosselii, P. plecoglossicida and several genomic species (new species which are currentely not validely defined as new species.

A variety of P. putida, called multiplasmid hydrocarbon-degrading Pseudomonas, is the first patented organism in the world. Because it is a living organism, the patent was disputed and brought before the United States Supreme Court in the historic court case Diamond v. Chakrabarty, which the inventor, Ananda Mohan Chakrabarty, won. It demonstrates a very diverse metabolism, including the ability to degrade organic solvents such as toluene. This ability has been put to use in bioremediation, or the use of microorganisms to degrade environmental pollutants. Use of P. putida is preferable to some other Pseudomonas species capable of such degradation, as it is a safe species of bacteria, unlike P. aeruginosa, for example, which is an opportunistic human pathogen.

Genomics 
The protein count and GC content of the (63) genomes that belong to the P. putida wider evolutionary group (as defined by a phylogenomic analysis of 494 complete genomes from the entire Pseudomonas genus) ranges between 3748–6780 (average: 5197) and between 58.7–64.4% (average: 62.3%), respectively. The core proteome of the analyzed 63 genomes (of the P. putida group) comprised 1724 proteins, of which only 1 core protein was specific for this group, meaning that it was absent in all other analyzed Pseudomonads.

Uses

Bioremediation
The diverse metabolism of wild-type strains of P. putida may be exploited for bioremediation; for example, it has been shown in the laboratory to function as a soil inoculant to remedy naphthalene-contaminated soils.

Pseudomonas putida is capable of converting styrene oil into the biodegradable plastic PHA. This may be of use in the effective recycling of polystyrene foam, otherwise thought to be not biodegradable.

Biocontrol
Pseudomonas putida has demonstrated potential biocontrol properties, as an effective antagonist of plant pathogens such as Pythium aphanidermatum and Fusarium oxysporum f. sp. radicis-lycopersici.

Oligonucleotide usage signatures of the P. alloputida KT2440 genome
Di- to pentanucleotide usage and the list of the most abundant octa- to tetradecanucleotides are useful measures of the bacterial genomic signature. The P. putida KT2440 chromosome is characterized by strand symmetry and intrastrand parity of complementary oligonucleotides. Each tetranucleotide occurs with similar frequency on the two strands. Tetranucleotide usage is biased by G+C content and physicochemical constraints such as base stacking energy, dinucleotide propeller twist angle, or trinucleotide bendability. The 105 regions with atypical oligonucleotide composition can be differentiated by their patterns of oligonucleotide usage into categories of horizontally acquired gene islands, multidomain genes or ancient regions such as genes for ribosomal proteins and RNAs. A species-specific extragenic palindromic sequence is the most common repeat in the genome that can be exploited for the typing of P. putida strains. In the coding sequence of P. putida, LLL is the most abundant tripeptide. Phylogenomic analysis reclassified the strain KT2440 in a new species Pseudomonas alloputida.

Organic synthesis 
Pseudomonas putida's amenability to genetic manipulation has allowed it to be used in the synthesis of numerous organic pharmaceutical and agricultural compounds from various substrates.

CBB5 and caffeine consumption 
Pseudomonas putida CBB5, a nonengineered, wild-type variety found in soil, can live on caffeine and has been observed to break caffeine down into carbon dioxide and ammonia.

References

External links
 Risk Assessment Summary, CEPA 1999. Pseudomonas putida CR30RNSLL(pADPTel).
Pseudomonas putida is an example for plant growth promoting Rhizobacterium, which produces iron chelating substances.
Type strain of Pseudomonas putida at BacDive – the Bacterial Diversity Metadatabase

Pseudomonadales
Oil spill remediation technologies
Bacteria described in 1889